Anatomy 2 is a 2003 German thriller film written and directed by Stefan Ruzowitzky. It is the sequel to the 2000 film Anatomy, that starred Franka Potente. The story moves to Berlin for this film.

Plot 

The Heidelberg chapter of the Anti-Hippocratic Society for unrestricted medical research has been shut down, but at a prestigious Berlin hospital the society still thrives. The young neurosurgeon Jo from Duisburg gets caught up in a research group led by doctor Mueller LaRousse, who urges his students to test their progress on themselves. Jo participates in the trials to eventually help his brother, who has Muscular Dystrophy. When Jo and some of his fellow students show some reluctance, Mueller LaRousse uses alternative means to punish them before they can give up the society to Paula Henning, who is now investigating the society for the police.

Cast
 Barnaby Metschurat as Joachim Hauser
 Ariane Schnug as Junge Kellerin
 Herbert Knaup as Prof. Charles Müller-LaRousse
 Wotan Wilke Möhring as Gregor
 Heike Makatsch as Viktoria
 Franka Potente as Paula Henning

Home media
Anatomy 2 was released on DVD by Columbia TriStar on October 14, 2003; and on May 10, the following year. It was later released in 2013 on DVD and Blu-ray by Mill Creek Entertainment on May 7, and 14th respectively.

Reception

On Rotten Tomatoes the film holds a critic approval rating of 29% based on seven reviews, with an average rating of 4.1/10. On Metacritic, the film has a weighted average score of 46 out of 100, based on 5 critics, indicating "Mixed or average reviews".

References

External links 
 Official site (in German)
 
 
 
 

2003 films
2003 horror films
2003 psychological thriller films
2000s slasher films
Films directed by Stefan Ruzowitzky
Films set in Berlin
Films shot in Germany
2000s German-language films
German slasher films
German psychological thriller films
German horror thriller films
2000s psychological horror films
2000s German films